Colin Miller (born October 25, 1996) is an American soccer player who plays as a goalkeeper.

College & Amateur 
Miller played while a student C. Milton Wright High School in Bel Air, Maryland from 2010 to 2014, along with spending time in Baltimore Bays Chelsea F.C.'s youth academy.

Miller played college soccer at Providence College between 2014 and 2018, spending the 2014 season as a redshirt.

While at college, Miller appeared for National Premier Soccer League side Detroit City FC during their 2017 season.

Professional 
On February 27, 2019, Miller joined USL Championship side Loudoun United ahead of their inaugural season. He made his debut in the 31st minute in a game against Louisville City FC. He was re-signed by Loudoun on January 7, 2020.

Miller joined USL Championship side Rio Grande Valley FC on April 6, 2021.

References

External links
Profile at Providence

1996 births
Living people
People from Bel Air, Maryland
Soccer players from Maryland
American soccer players
Association football goalkeepers
Providence Friars men's soccer players
Detroit City FC players
Loudoun United FC players
Rio Grande Valley FC Toros players
National Premier Soccer League players
USL Championship players